Dan Spang (born August 16, 1983) is a former American-Italian professional ice hockey defenseman. He last played for Löwen Frankfurt in the German DEL2. Spang was selected by the San Jose Sharks in the 2nd round (52nd overall) of the 2002 NHL Entry Draft.

Playing career
Spang won a Massachusetts state championship in 2000 at Winchester High School. He was drafted by the San Jose Sharks in the second round, 52nd overall, of the 2002 NHL Entry Draft.

During his collegiate career, he was a co-winner of Boston University’s Most Improved Player Award following the 2003–04 season. Spang led Boston University defensemen in goals (nine), assists (22) and points (31) in 40 games as a senior. Won a Hockey East regular season and tournament championship at Boston University in 2005–06 he was an Alternate Captain for the Worcester Sharks as a rookie in 2006–07 and remained with the club for the following 2007-08 season.

The 2008-09 season saw him play for AHL franchises Quad City Flames, Syracuse Crunch as well as for ECHL’s Las Vegas Wranglers.

On July 21, 2009, he signed a contract for Nürnberg Ice Tigers of the Deutsche Eishockey Liga, where he spent the entire 2009-10 season. He then signed with the Dallas Stars organization to play for them in the 2010–11 season. However, he was assigned to the affiliates Texas Stars of the AHL.

Although Spang signed with the Växjö Lakers Hockey of the Swedish Elitserien (SEL) on May 4, 2011, he extended his contract with the Dallas Stars organization on June 16, 2011.

Between 2012 and 2015, Spang played for three different teams of the Finnish elite league Liiga, HPK, SaiPa and Kärpät. In between, during the 2012–13 season, he had a stint with Swedish SHL side HV71.

Spang opened the 2015–16 season in the KHL on the roster of Torpedo Nizhny Novgorod. After eleven games played, he moved on to Czech club HC Kometa Brno. In December, he was signed by HC Lugano of Switzerland on loan to strengthen the club's roster at the Spengler-Cup. In late January 2016, he signed with the Hamburg Freezers of the German top-tier league, DEL, for the remainder of the 2015–16 campaign.

After two seasons with the Nottingham Panthers, Spang returned to Germany in 2018 with DEL2 side Löwen Frankfurt before retiring.

Career statistics

Awards and honors

References

External links 

1983 births
Living people
American men's ice hockey defensemen
Boston University Terriers men's ice hockey players
Cleveland Barons (2001–2006) players
Ice hockey players from Massachusetts
Las Vegas Wranglers players
Nürnberg Ice Tigers players
People from Winchester, Massachusetts
Quad City Flames players
San Jose Sharks draft picks
Sportspeople from Middlesex County, Massachusetts
Syracuse Crunch players
Texas Stars players
Worcester Sharks players
Hamburg Freezers players
Torpedo Nizhny Novgorod players
Oulun Kärpät players
HV71 players
SaiPa players
HPK players
HC Kometa Brno players
Nottingham Panthers players
Löwen Frankfurt players
Winchester High School (Massachusetts) alumni
AHCA Division I men's ice hockey All-Americans
American expatriate ice hockey players in Finland
American expatriate ice hockey players in Sweden
American expatriate ice hockey players in Germany
American expatriate ice hockey players in Russia
American expatriate ice hockey players in the Czech Republic
American expatriate ice hockey players in England
American expatriate ice hockey players in Switzerland
American people of Italian descent